Perkins, Fellows & Hamilton Office and Studio is a brick and stone building located along the Magnificent Mile in the Near North Side community area of Chicago, Illinois.  It  was named a Chicago Landmark on December 1, 1993.

Notes

Chicago Landmarks
Commercial buildings completed in 1917